South Side High School is the only public high school in the village of Rockville Centre, New York. South Side, a part of the Rockville Centre School District, serves grades 9 through 12 and boasts a variety of academic, extra-curricular and athletic programs, including the International Baccalaureate (IB) Curriculum in junior and senior years. School district boundaries can be found in Rockville Centre and South Hempstead. In 2008 South Side was ranked  47 in the top 100 high schools in the nation by Newsweeks "The Top of the Class:  The complete list of the top 1,300 top U.S. high schools". South Side has maintained this distinction, at No. 65 in 2003, No. 45 in 2005, No. 32 in 2006 and No. 44 in 2007.

The primary address for South Side is 140 Shepherd Street, Rockville Centre, New York 11570. Located further south in Rockville Centre is the "Greenhouse". Established in 1975, the purpose of this off-site school is to provide a different approach to teaching students with academic or personal troubles as well as different scheduling and academic programs. The main building has two floors.

As of the 2014–15 school year, the school had an enrollment of 1,092 students and 93.7 classroom teachers (on an FTE basis), for a student–teacher ratio of 11.6:1. There were 109 students (10.0% of enrollment) eligible for free lunch and 28 (2.6% of students) eligible for reduced-cost lunch.

School history
The school's name reflects its status as the first high school on Long Island's south shore, east of Jamaica. It has retained that name though most of Long Island's incorporated villages have established high schools named for their village.

The Shepherd Street address is the third location for the school, its first site (1892–1923) was on College Place, now the Municipal Building of Rockville Centre. Its second site (1924–1954) on Hillside Avenue is now South Side Middle School.  The school has served grades 9–12 since 1982–83, having previously been a 10–12 institution with the freshman attending what was then South Side Junior High School along with the seventh- and eighth-graders.  The switch occurred as the district's sixth-graders moved to the Junior High, with that institution becoming the Middle School of RVC.

The most prominent architectural characteristic of the current building is the colonnade adorning the entrance on the west side of the building.  This feature gives its name to the school's annual yearbook, The Colonnade, but is unusual in that it is not associated with either of the school's grand entrances to the north and the south, which face the parking lots and athletic fields.

Facilities
The school district headquarters, the William H. Johnson Administration Building, is on the high school campus; it was given its current name in 2020.

Sports

South Side High School has a rich athletic history dating back to the 1920s. Three teams (boys' lacrosse, boys' basketball, girls' volleyball, girls' soccer) have won New York State Championships. The most famous of the many championship teams is the 1971 Boys' Basketball Team, co-captained by then senior Daniel Gastman and then Junior William "Beaver" Smith.  It was the first championship of the modern era.  The finals game was played at Hofstra University's Athletic Center and transmitted over WWGBB radio. The other starting players on than historic team were Beaver's brother Greg Smith, David Lucey, and William "Igor" Sisti.  South Side concluded its Championship season (21-2) with a thrilling Overtime Victory against a previously unbeaten Great Neck North Hi team that had been 21-0 up until that point. Senior's Dan Gastman's behind the basket 22'corner jumper and Bill's Sisti's strategic defensive offensive foul call helped tilt the result the Cyclones way.  Bob Bigelow was South Side's Coach.  South Side repeated as Champions the following year, and South Side won many more titles in the ensuing years.  Another successful team is the Lady Cyclones Soccer Team, which discovered its championship pedigree after Bob Bigelow was relieved of coaching the boys' basketball team and accepted the position coaching girls' soccer.  Bigelow said both Championship experiences were great, but the girls were easier to coach. In the past 20 years, the Lady Cyclones have won 17 State Championships including most recently in 2012, when the girls dominated their opponents, scoring 63 goals and only allowing 6, going 18–0–1. In 2013 the girls were ranked #1 in the State and #4 in the nation.  At the end of the 2009 season, the varsity girls soccer team was ranked #1 in the nation.

In 2003–04 the boys' basketball teams captured the county championship for the first time since 1998, besting all Nassau County opponents. 2004 also saw the boys' lacrosse program capture its first State Lacrosse Championship.

Red and Blue
Red and Blue is an annual competition held by South Side High School since 1916.  "Red and Blue started when girls weren't allowed to participate in team sports". Author and historian Doris Kearns Goodwin wrote extensively about Red and Blue in her autobiographical memoir "Wait Till Next Year." Since 1979 Title IX has mandated that girls have equivalent access to sports and other activities, but the tradition has lived on, with approximately 300 (mostly) female students participating each year.  In recent years, the event has also raised money to benefit Breast Cancer research and support. Additionally, talks about removing or opening this competition to all genders have been a topic of heavy debate in recent years.

Notable alumni
The following notable people graduated from South Side High School:

Dave Attell, comedian, actor, 1983
Gina Naomi Baez, actress, 2006
Whittaker Chambers, writer, editor, Communist party member, and spy for the Soviet Union who defected and became an outspoken opponent of communism, 1919
Alta Cohen, Major League Baseball player
Kevin Connors, sportscaster, 1993
Kim Conway Haley, soccer player, 1990
Ted Demme, film producer, director, 1981
Anthony Drazan, screenwriter, film director, and actor, 1973
Crystal Dunn, U.S. Women's National Team soccer player, 2010
Max von Essen, Tony Award-nominated Broadway actor, 1992
Martin Feldstein, economist, economic adviser to President Ronald Reagan, 1957
Susan Fromberg Schaeffer, novelist ("Anya," "The Madness of a Seduced Woman," etc.), 1957
Doris Kearns Goodwin, Pulitzer Prize-winning historian, author ("Team of Rivals", "Wait Till Next Year," etc.), 1960
Mel Gussow, theater critic for the New York Times, 1951
Donald Holder, Broadway light designer, 1976
Tim Holland, backgammon world champion, author, teacher, professional gambler, 1948
Dean Kamen, inventor, entrepreneur, 1969
Deborah Kass, artist, Board of Directors member for the Andy Warhol Foundation for the Visual Arts, 1970
Karen Klonsky, noted agricultural economist, 1970
Dan Mishkin, writer; co-creator of Amethyst and Blue Devil for DC Comics, 1970
Mark O'Connell, drummer for rock band Taking Back Sunday, 1999
June Diane Raphael, actress, 1998
Amy Schumer, comedian and actor, 1999
Dean Skelos, New York State Senator, Majority Leader of the NYS Senate, 1966
Howard Stern, radio personality, 1972
Laura Stevenson, musician and songwriter, 2002
Danielle Elizabeth Tumminio, writer, theologian, Episcopal priest, and life coach, 1999

References

External links
 The South Side boys varsity lacrosse team playing Cold Spring Harbor in Manhasset on 3-31-07
 South Side vs Garden City boys varsity baseball on 4-21-07
 Rockville Centre School District
 South Side High School

Public high schools in New York (state)
Schools in Nassau County, New York